WZMG (910 AM) is a radio station broadcasting sports and a Fox Sports Radio affiliate. Licensed to Pepperell, Alabama, United States, the station serves the Auburn Metropolitan Area.  The station is currently owned by San Antonio–based iHeartMedia, through licensee iHM Licenses, LLC.  WZMG features some programming from Westwood One.

History
In August 1998, Fuller Broadcasting Company, Inc., reached an agreement to sell this station to Root Communications License Company, L.P., as part of a five-station deal.  The deal was approved by the FCC on October 5, 1998, and the transaction was consummated in December 1998.  Gary Fuller, president and CEO of Fuller Broadcasting Company from 1985 until he sold the company in December 1998, was elected mayor of Opelika, Alabama, in August 2004.

In March 2003, Root Communications License Company, L.P., reached an agreement to sell this station to Qantum Communications subsidiary Qantum of Auburn License Company, LLC, as part of a 26 station deal valued at $82.2 million.  The deal was approved by the FCC on April 30, 2003, and the transaction was consummated on July 2, 2003.

On May 15, 2014, Qantum Communications announced that it would sell its 29 stations, including WZMG, to Clear Channel Communications (now iHeartMedia), in a transaction connected to Clear Channel's sale of WALK AM-FM in Patchogue, New York to Connoisseur Media via Qantum. The transaction was consummated on September 9, 2014.

On December 15, 2015, WZMG changed their format to gospel, branded as "Hallelujah 910".

On July 1, 2019, WZMG changed their format to sports, branded as "Fox Sports 910 AM - 1310 AM The Game".

Previous logo

References

External links

ZMG
Lee County, Alabama
Radio stations established in 1979
1979 establishments in Alabama
IHeartMedia radio stations